The Playmore–Bowery Road Historic District is a residential historic district composed of a collection of summer resort houses in the hills east of Highlands, North Carolina. Bowery Road roughly parallels Horse Cove Road to the north, and is lined with a series of wood-frame summer that were built between about 1880 and 1930.

The district is listed on the National Register of Historic Places in 2002.

See also
National Register of Historic Places listings in Macon County, North Carolina

References

Historic districts in Macon County, North Carolina
Historic districts on the National Register of Historic Places in North Carolina
Houses in Macon County, North Carolina
National Register of Historic Places in Macon County, North Carolina